The 1982 Lehigh Engineers football team was an American football team that represented Lehigh University as an independent during the 1982 NCAA Division I-AA football season. 

In their seventh year under head coach John Whitehead, the Engineers compiled a 4–6 record. John Ashler, Ed Godbolt and Jack Meyers were the team captains.

Lehigh played its home games at Taylor Stadium on the university's main campus in Bethlehem, Pennsylvania.

Schedule

References

Lehigh
Lehigh Mountain Hawks football seasons
Lehigh Engineers football